Gechi Qeshlaq Amirlu (also Romanized as Gechī Qeshlāq  Amīrlū) is a village in Angut-e Gharbi Rural District, Anguti District, Germi County, Ardabil Province, Iran. At the 2006 census, its population was 54, in 12 families.

References 

Towns and villages in Germi County